Acianthera is a genus of orchids native to the tropical parts of the Western Hemisphere, especially Brazil. It was first described in 1842 but was not widely recognized until recently. Most of the species were formerly placed under Pleurothallis subgenus Acianthera. This splitting is a result of recent DNA sequencing.

Species
, Plants of the World Online accepted about 300 species within Acianthera:

Acianthera aberrans (Luer) Pupulin & Bogarín
Acianthera aculeata (Luer & Hirtz) Luer
Acianthera acuminatipetala (A.Samp.) Luer
Acianthera adamantinensis (Brade) F.Barros
Acianthera adeodata P.Ortiz, O.Pérez & E.Parra
Acianthera adirii (Brade) Pridgeon & M.W.Chase
Acianthera aechme (Luer) Pridgeon & M.W.Chase
Acianthera agathophylla (Rchb.f.) Pridgeon & M.W.Chase
Acianthera alainii (Dod) A.Doucette
Acianthera albiflora (Barb.Rodr.) Karremans
Acianthera albopurpurea (Kraenzl.) Chiron & Van den Berg
Acianthera alpestris (Sw.) A.Doucette
Acianthera amandae Campacci & C.R.M.Silva
Acianthera amaralii (Pabst) F.Barros & L.R.S.Guim.
Acianthera amsleri Rykacz., Driessen & Kolan.
Acianthera angustifolia (Lindl.) Luer
Acianthera angustisepala (Ames & Correll) Pridgeon & M.W.Chase
Acianthera antennata (Garay) Pridgeon & M.W.Chase
Acianthera aphthosa (Lindl.) Pridgeon & M.W.Chase
Acianthera appendiculata (Cogn.) A.Doucette
Acianthera asaroides (Kraenzl.) Pridgeon & M.W.Chase
Acianthera atroglossa (Loefgr.) F.Barros & L.R.S.Guim.
Acianthera atropurpurea (Barb.Rodr.) Chiron & Van den Berg
Acianthera auriculata (Lindl.) Pridgeon & M.W.Chase
Acianthera bahorucensis (Luer) A.Doucette
Acianthera barthelemyi (Luer) Karremans
Acianthera berlinensis Damian, Chiron, Mitidieri & Rimarachin
Acianthera beyrodtiana (Kraenzl.) Karremans
Acianthera bibarbellata (Kraenzl.) F.Barros & L.R.S.Guim.
Acianthera bicarinata (Lindl.) Pridgeon & M.W.Chase
Acianthera biceps (Luer & Hirtz) Luer
Acianthera bicornuta (Barb.Rodr.) Pridgeon & M.W.Chase
Acianthera bidentata (Lindl.) F.Barros & V.T.Rodrigues
Acianthera bidentula (Barb.Rodr.) Pridgeon & M.W.Chase
Acianthera bilobulata Zambrano & Solano
Acianthera binotii (Regel) Pridgeon & M.W.Chase
Acianthera bissei (Luer) Luer
Acianthera boliviana (Rchb.f.) Pridgeon & M.W.Chase
Acianthera brachiloba (Hoehne) Pridgeon & M.W.Chase
Acianthera bragae (Ruschi) F.Barros
Acianthera breedlovei Soto Arenas, Solano & Salazar
Acianthera breviflora (Lindl.) Luer
Acianthera brunnescens (Schltr.) Karremans
Acianthera bryonii Luer
Acianthera butcheri (L.O.Williams) Pridgeon & M.W.Chase
Acianthera cabiriae Pupulin, G.A.Rojas & J.D.Zuñiga
Acianthera cachensis (Ames) Karremans
Acianthera caldensis (Hoehne & Schltr.) F.Barros
Acianthera calopedilon Toscano & Luer
Acianthera calypso (Luer) Karremans & Rinc.-González
Acianthera capanemae (Barb.Rodr.) Pridgeon & M.W.Chase
Acianthera caparaoensis (Brade) Pridgeon & M.W.Chase
Acianthera capillaris (Lindl.) Pridgeon & M.W.Chase
Acianthera carcinopsis Luer & Sijm
Acianthera carinata (C.Schweinf.) Luer
Acianthera catujiensis Campacci & C.R.M.Silva
Acianthera caymanensis (C.D.Adams) Karremans
Acianthera cephalopodiglossa Toscano & Luer
Acianthera cerberus (Luer & R.Vásquez) Pridgeon & M.W.Chase
Acianthera chamelopoda (Luer) Luer
Acianthera chionopa (Luer) Pridgeon & M.W.Chase
Acianthera chrysantha (Lindl.) Pridgeon & M.W.Chase
Acianthera ciliata (Knowles & Westc.) F.Barros & L.R.S.Guim.
Acianthera circumplexa (Lindl.) Pridgeon & M.W.Chase
Acianthera cogniauxiana (Schltr.) Pridgeon & M.W.Chase
Acianthera compressicaulis (Dod) Pridgeon & M.W.Chase
Acianthera consatae (Luer & R.Vásquez) Luer
Acianthera cordatifolia (Dod) Pridgeon & M.W.Chase
Acianthera cornejoi Luer
Acianthera costabilis (Luer & R.Vásquez) Luer
Acianthera costaricensis (Schltr.) Pupulin & Karremans
Acianthera crassilabia (Ames & C.Schweinf.) Luer
Acianthera cremasta (Luer & J.Portilla) Luer
Acianthera crepiniana (Cogn.) Chiron & Van den Berg
Acianthera crinita (Barb.Rodr.) Pridgeon & M.W.Chase
Acianthera cryptantha (Barb.Rodr.) Pridgeon & M.W.Chase
Acianthera cryptophoranthoides (Loefgr.) F.Barros
Acianthera decipiens (Ames & C.Schweinf.) Pridgeon & M.W.Chase
Acianthera decurrens (Poepp. & Endl.) Pridgeon & M.W.Chase
Acianthera denticulata (Cogn.) Karremans
Acianthera deserta (Luer & R.Vásquez) Luer
Acianthera dichroa (Rchb.f.) F.Barros & L.R.S.Guim.
Acianthera discophylla (Luer & Carnevali) Luer
Acianthera dodsonii (Luer) Karremans & Rinc.-González
Acianthera duartei (Hoehne) Pridgeon & M.W.Chase
Acianthera dubbeldamii Luer & Sijm
Acianthera dutrae (Pabst) C.N.Gonç. & Waechter
Acianthera echinocarpa (C.Schweinf.) A.Doucette
Acianthera echinosa Luer & Toscano
Acianthera ellipsophylla (L.O.Williams) Pridgeon & M.W.Chase
Acianthera erebatensis (Carnevali & G.A.Romero) Luer
Acianthera ericae Luer
Acianthera erinacea (Rchb.f.) A.Doucette
Acianthera erosa (Urb.) A.Doucette
Acianthera erythrogramma (Luer & Carnevali) Luer
Acianthera esmeraldae (Luer & Hirtz) Luer
Acianthera exarticulata (Barb.Rodr.) Pridgeon & M.W.Chase
Acianthera exdrasii (Luer & Toscano) Luer
Acianthera eximia (L.O.Williams) Solano
Acianthera fabiobarrosii (Borba & Semir) F.Barros & F.Pinheiro
Acianthera fecunda Pupulin, G.A.Rojas & J.D.Zuñiga
Acianthera fenestrata (Barb.Rodr.) Pridgeon & M.W.Chase
Acianthera fernandezii Luer
Acianthera fockei (Lindl.) Pridgeon & M.W.Chase
Acianthera foetens (Lindl.) Chiron & Van den Berg
Acianthera fornograndensis L.Kollmann & A.P.Fontana
Acianthera freyi (Luer) F.Barros & V.T.Rodrigues
Acianthera fumioi (T.Hashim.) Luer
Acianthera garciae (Luer) Pridgeon & M.W.Chase
Acianthera geminicaulina (Ames) Pridgeon & M.W.Chase
Acianthera gigantea (Lindl.) A.Doucette
Acianthera glanduligera (Lindl.) Luer
Acianthera glumacea (Lindl.) Pridgeon & M.W.Chase
Acianthera gouveiae (A.Samp.) F.Barros & L.R.S.Guim.
Acianthera gracilis (Barb.Rodr.) F.Barros & L.R.S.Guim.
Acianthera gracilisepala (Brade) Luer
Acianthera gradeae Chiron & Benelli
Acianthera granitica (Luer & G.A.Romero) Luer
Acianthera greenwoodii Soto Arenas
Acianthera hamata Pupulin & G.A.Rojas
Acianthera hartwegiifolia (H.Wendl. & Kraenzl.) Solano & Soto Arenas
Acianthera hastulata (Rchb.f. & Warm.) Karremans
Acianthera hatschbachii (Schltr.) Chiron & Van den Berg
Acianthera heliconioides (Luer & R.Vásquez) Pridgeon & M.W.Chase
Acianthera heliconiscapa (Hoehne) F.Barros
Acianthera henrici (Schltr.) Luer
Acianthera heringeri (Hoehne) F.Barros
Acianthera herrerae (Luer) Solano & Soto Arenas
Acianthera herzogii (Schltr.) Baumbach
Acianthera heteropetala (Luer) Pridgeon & M.W.Chase
Acianthera hintonii (L.O.Williams) A.Doucette
Acianthera hirsutula (Fawc. & Rendle) Pridgeon & M.W.Chase
Acianthera hirtipes (Schltr.) Rojas-Alv. & Karremans
Acianthera hirtzii (Luer) Karremans & Rinc.-González
Acianthera hoffmannseggiana (Rchb.f.) F.Barros
Acianthera hondurensis (Ames) Pridgeon & M.W.Chase
Acianthera hygrophila (Barb.Rodr.) Pridgeon & M.W.Chase
Acianthera hystrix (Kraenzl.) F.Barros
Acianthera imitator Toscano, Luer & L.Kollmann
Acianthera inaequalis (Lindl.) F.Barros & L.R.S.Guim.
Acianthera johannensis (Barb.Rodr.) Pridgeon & M.W.Chase
Acianthera johnsonii (Ames) Pridgeon & M.W.Chase
Acianthera jordanensis (Brade) F.Barros
Acianthera juxtaposita (Luer) Luer
Acianthera kateora (Garay) Karremans & Rinc.-González
Acianthera kegelii (Rchb.f.) Luer
Acianthera klingelfusii Luer, Toscano & Baptista
Acianthera klotzschiana (Rchb.f.) Pridgeon & M.W.Chase
Acianthera krahnii Luer & Vásquez
Acianthera lamia (Luer) Pridgeon & M.W.Chase
Acianthera langeana (Kraenzl.) Pridgeon & M.W.Chase
Acianthera lappago (Luer) A.Doucette
Acianthera laxa (Sw.) A.Doucette
Acianthera lepidota (L.O.Williams) Pridgeon & M.W.Chase
Acianthera leptotifolia (Barb.Rodr.) Pridgeon & M.W.Chase
Acianthera limae (Porto & Brade) Pridgeon & M.W.Chase
Acianthera litensis (Luer & Hirtz) Luer
Acianthera lojae (Schltr.) Luer
Acianthera lueri Kolan. & Szlach.
Acianthera luteola (Lindl.) Pridgeon & M.W.Chase
Acianthera macilenta Luer & Hirtz
Acianthera macropoda (Barb.Rodr.) Pridgeon & M.W.Chase
Acianthera macuconensis (Barb.Rodr.) F.Barros
Acianthera maculiglossa Chiron & N.Sanson
Acianthera madisonii (Luer) Pridgeon & M.W.Chase
Acianthera magalhanesii (Pabst) F.Barros
Acianthera majakoluckae Soto Arenas & Solano
Acianthera malachantha (Rchb.f.) Pridgeon & M.W.Chase
Acianthera marleniae Damian, Chiron & Mitidieri
Acianthera marquesii Luer & Toscano
Acianthera marumbyana (Garay) Luer
Acianthera melachila (Barb.Rodr.) Luer
Acianthera melanochthoda (Luer & Hirtz) Pridgeon & M.W.Chase
Acianthera melanoglossa (Luer & R.Escobar) Luer
Acianthera mendozae Luer
Acianthera mexiae (Luer) Pridgeon & M.W.Chase
Acianthera micrantha (Barb.Rodr.) Pridgeon & M.W.Chase
Acianthera minima (Cogn.) F.Barros
Acianthera minuta (Rolfe) Karremans
Acianthera miqueliana (H.Focke) Pridgeon & M.W.Chase
Acianthera modestissima (Rchb.f. & Warm.) Pridgeon & M.W.Chase
Acianthera monophylla (Hook.) Karremans
Acianthera montana (Barb.Rodr.) F.Barros & L.R.S.Guim.
Acianthera morenoi (Luer) Pridgeon & M.W.Chase
Acianthera morilloi (Carnevali & I.Ramírez) Luer
Acianthera moronae (Luer & Hirtz) Luer
Acianthera murex (Rchb.f.) Luer
Acianthera murexoidea (Pabst) Pridgeon & M.W.Chase
Acianthera muscicola (Barb.Rodr.) Pridgeon & M.W.Chase
Acianthera muscosa (Barb.Rodr.) Pridgeon & M.W.Chase
Acianthera myrticola (Barb.Rodr.) F.Barros & L.R.S.Guim.
Acianthera nellyae (P.Ortiz) Karremans
Acianthera nemorosa (Barb.Rodr.) F.Barros
Acianthera nikoleae A.Doucette & J.Portilla
Acianthera obscura (A.Rich. & Galeotti) Pridgeon & M.W.Chase
Acianthera ochreata (Lindl.) Pridgeon & M.W.Chase
Acianthera octophrys (Rchb.f.) Pridgeon & M.W.Chase
Acianthera odontotepala (Rchb.f.) Luer
Acianthera ofella (Luer) Pridgeon & M.W.Chase
Acianthera oligantha (Barb.Rodr.) F.Barros
Acianthera omissa (Luer) Pridgeon & M.W.Chase
Acianthera oricola (H.Stenzel) Karremans, Chiron & Van den Berg
Acianthera oscitans (Ames) Pridgeon & M.W.Chase
Acianthera pacayana (Schltr.) Solano & Soto Arenas
Acianthera panduripetala (Barb.Rodr.) Pridgeon & M.W.Chase
Acianthera pantasmi (Rchb.f.) Pridgeon & M.W.Chase
Acianthera pantasmoides (C.Schweinf.) Pridgeon & M.W.Chase
Acianthera papillosa (Lindl.) Pridgeon & M.W.Chase
Acianthera paradoxa (Luer & Dalström) Karremans
Acianthera pardipes (Rchb.f.) Pridgeon & M.W.Chase
Acianthera pariaensis (Carnevali & G.A.Romero) Carnevali & G.A.Romero
Acianthera parva (Rolfe) F.Barros & L.R.S.Guim.
Acianthera pavimentata (Rchb.f.) Pridgeon & M.W.Chase
Acianthera pazii Luer
Acianthera pectinata (Lindl.) Pridgeon & M.W.Chase
Acianthera pendens (Dod) A.Doucette
Acianthera per-dusenii (Hoehne) F.Barros & L.R.S.Guim.
Acianthera pernambucensis (Rolfe) F.Barros
Acianthera phoenicoptera (Carnevali & G.A.Romero) Luer
Acianthera phrynoglossa (Luer & Hirtz) A.Doucette
Acianthera platystachys (Regel) Chiron & Van den Berg
Acianthera pollardiana Solano
Acianthera polystachya (Ruiz & Pav.) Pupulin
Acianthera portilloi (Luer & R.Escobar) Karremans & Rinc.-González
Acianthera privigna (Luer) A.Doucette
Acianthera prognatha (Luer & R.Escobar) Pridgeon & M.W.Chase
Acianthera prolifera (Herb. ex Lindl.) Pridgeon & M.W.Chase
Acianthera prostrata (Lindl.) A.Doucette
Acianthera pubescens (Lindl.) Pridgeon & M.W.Chase
Acianthera punctatiflora (Luer) Pridgeon & M.W.Chase
Acianthera punicea (Luer) Pridgeon & M.W.Chase
Acianthera purpurascens (Luer & Hirtz) Karremans
Acianthera purpureoviolacea (Cogn.) F.Barros
Acianthera pustulata Zambrano & Solano
Acianthera quadricristata (Luer & Hirtz) Luer
Acianthera quadriserrata (Luer) Pridgeon & M.W.Chase
Acianthera quisqueyana (Dod) A.Doucette
Acianthera ramosa (Barb.Rodr.) F.Barros
Acianthera recurva (Lindl.) Pridgeon & M.W.Chase
Acianthera rinkei Luer
Acianthera rodolfovasquezii Damian
Acianthera rodrigoi (Luer) Luer
Acianthera rodriguesii (Cogn.) Pridgeon & M.W.Chase
Acianthera rostellata (Barb.Rodr.) Luer
Acianthera rubroviridis (Lindl.) Pridgeon & M.W.Chase
Acianthera ruizii Damian
Acianthera sandaliorum (G.A.Romero & Carnevali) Luer
Acianthera saraca-taquerensis Campacci & J.B.F.Silva
Acianthera sarcosepala (Carnevali & I.Ramírez) Carnevali & G.A.Romero
Acianthera saundersiana (Rchb.f.) Pridgeon & M.W.Chase
Acianthera saurocephala (G.Lodd.) Pridgeon & M.W.Chase
Acianthera scabripes (Lindl.) Karremans
Acianthera scalpricaulis (Luer) Pridgeon & M.W.Chase
Acianthera serpentula (Barb.Rodr.) F.Barros
Acianthera serratifolia Rinc.-González & Karremans
Acianthera serrulata (Barb.Rodr.) Karremans
Acianthera serrulatipetala (Barb.Rodr.) Pridgeon & M.W.Chase
Acianthera sicaria (Lindl.) Pridgeon & M.W.Chase
Acianthera sicariopsis (Luer) Pridgeon & M.W.Chase
Acianthera sicula (Luer & R.Vásquez) Luer
Acianthera sigmoidea (Ames & C.Schweinf.) A.Doucette
Acianthera silvae (Luer & Toscano) Luer
Acianthera similis (Schltr.) Karremans, Chiron & Van den Berg
Acianthera simpliciflora (Dod) A.Doucette
Acianthera sonderiana (Rchb.f.) Pridgeon & M.W.Chase
Acianthera sotoana Solano
Acianthera stenzelii Luer
Acianthera strupifolia (Lindl.) Pridgeon & M.W.Chase
Acianthera subrotundifolia (Cogn.) F.Barros & V.T.Rodrigues
Acianthera sudae J.Ponert, Chumová, Mandáková & P.Trávn.
Acianthera sulcata (Porsch) F.Barros & V.T.Rodrigues
Acianthera sulphurea (Barb.Rodr.) F.Barros & V.T.Rodrigues
Acianthera tanyae Luer & Cornejo
Acianthera teres (Lindl.) Borba
Acianthera testifolia (Sw.) Solano
Acianthera thysana (Luer & J.Portilla) Karremans
Acianthera tikalensis (Correll & C.Schweinf.) Pridgeon & M.W.Chase
Acianthera toachica (Luer & Dodson) Luer
Acianthera tokachii (Luer) Luer
Acianthera translucida (Barb.Rodr.) Luer
Acianthera tricarinata (Poepp. & Endl.) Pridgeon & M.W.Chase
Acianthera trichophora (Lindl.) A.Doucette
Acianthera tristis (Barb.Rodr.) Pridgeon & M.W.Chase
Acianthera tunguraguae (F.Lehm. & Kraenzl.) A.Doucette
Acianthera unguicallosa (Ames & C.Schweinf.) Solano
Acianthera variegata (Barb.Rodr.) Campacci
Acianthera venulosa Luer
Acianthera verecunda (Schltr.) Pridgeon & M.W.Chase
Acianthera villahermosae Sierra-Ariza, Rinc.-González & Karremans
Acianthera violacea (A.Rich. & Galeotti) Pridgeon & M.W.Chase
Acianthera violaceomaculata (Hoehne) Pridgeon & M.W.Chase
Acianthera viridis (Luer & Hirtz) Luer
Acianthera wageneriana (Klotzsch) Pridgeon & M.W.Chase
Acianthera wawraeana (Barb.Rodr.) F.Barros & V.T.Rodrigues
Acianthera welsiae-windischiae (Pabst) Pridgeon & M.W.Chase
Acianthera wilsonii (Lindl.) Pridgeon & M.W.Chase
Acianthera wyvern (Luer & R.Escobar) Pridgeon & M.W.Chase
Acianthera yauaperyensis (Barb.Rodr.) Pridgeon & M.W.Chase
Acianthera zumbae (Luer & Hirtz) Luer

References

External links 

 
Pleurothallidinae genera